Ekanayake Mudiyanselage Thanuga Priyadarshani Ekanayake (born 24 February 1972) is a Sri Lankan former cricketer who played as a wicket-keeper and right-handed batter. She appeared in one Test match and 43 One Day Internationals for Sri Lanka between 1997 and 2005. She played domestic cricket for Slimline Sports Club.

References

External links
 
 

1972 births
Living people
Cricketers from Colombo
Sri Lankan women cricketers
Sri Lanka women Test cricketers
Sri Lanka women One Day International cricketers
Slimline Sport Club women cricketers
Wicket-keepers